The Fort Martin Scott Treaty of 1850 was an unratified treaty between the United States government and the Comanche, Caddo, Quapaw, Tawakoni, Lipan Apache, and Waco tribes in Texas. The treaty was signed in San Saba County, Texas, but named after the nearest military outpost, Fort Martin Scott in Gillespie County, on the outskirts of Fredericksburg.

Background

The Fort Martin Scott Treaty was negotiated and signed on December 10, 1850 by Indian agent John Rollins, U. S. Army Captain Hamilton W. Merrill, Captain J.B. McGown of the Texas Mounted Volunteers (Texas Rangers), interpreters John Connor and Jesse Chisholm, as well as twelve Comanche chiefs, six Caddo chiefs, five Quapaw chiefs, four Tawakoni chiefs, four Lipan chiefs and four Waco chiefs.

Work on the contract was done primarily by Jesse Chisholm and John Connor, a Delaware chief, under the direction of Robert Neighbors and John Ford.  John H. Rollins who had fallen ill with tuberculosis had to be carried in to the signing ceremony, and eventually succumbed to the disease in September 1851.

On December 25, 1850, General George M. Brooke sent a copy of the treaty to Texas Governor Peter Hansborough Bell, mentioning the treaty had not been approved by the government and was essentially binding only on the part of the Indian tribes.

Text of treaty

See also
Fort Martin Scott

References

United States and Native American treaties
Native American history of Texas
History of Texas
Gillespie County, Texas
Caddo
Treaties concluded in 1850
Unratified treaties